Christian Ranneries (born ) is a Danish former road and track cyclist. He competed in the team pursuit event at the 2011 and 2012 UCI Track Cycling World Championships.

References

External links
 Profile at cyclingarchives.com

1988 births
Living people
Danish track cyclists
Danish male cyclists
People from Næstved Municipality
Sportspeople from Region Zealand